, also called , , , or  (meaning Moorland Elder), is the Japanese goddess of vegetation, grass, and fields. She is considered protector of fields. She is also considered the ancestor of herbs.

She is the daughter of Izanami and Izanagi. She is married to her husband and brother Ōyamatsumi, and gave birth to eight deities. Some versions of her origin story claim she is also the mother of Konohanasakuya-hime.

Worship 
In the past, people often prayed to her before cutting down wood or reeds for building. She was worshipped because the plants that she favored provided the raw materials for furniture and houses.

References 

Shinto
Japanese goddesses
Kunitsukami